Kordovan-e Sofla (also Romanized as Kordovān-e Soflá; also known as Kardovan, Kerdevān-e Pā’īn, Kordavān, Kordavān-e Pā’īn, Kordovān-e Pā’īn, Kurdavān Ahshām Saiyid, and Kūrdevān-e Ashām Seyyedī) is a village in Kabgan Rural District, Kaki District, Dashti County, Bushehr Province, Iran. At the 2006 census, its population was 565, in 142 families.

References 

Populated places in Dashti County